60S ribosomal protein L28 is a protein that in humans is encoded by the RPL28 gene.

Function 

Ribosomes, the organelles that catalyze protein synthesis, consist of a small 40S subunit and a large 60S subunit. Together these subunits are composed of 4 RNA species and approximately 80 structurally distinct proteins. This gene encodes a ribosomal protein that is a component of the 60S subunit. The protein belongs to the L28E family of ribosomal proteins. It is located in the cytoplasm. Variable expression of this gene in colorectal cancers compared to adjacent normal tissues has been observed, although no correlation between the level of expression and the severity of the disease has been found. As is typical for genes encoding ribosomal proteins, there are multiple processed pseudogenes of this gene dispersed through the genome.

References

External links
 
 PDBe-KB provides an overview of all the structure information available in the PDB for Human 60S ribosomal protein L28

Further reading

Ribosomal proteins